Our Daily Bread is a 2005 documentary film directed, co-produced, and with cinematography by Nikolaus Geyrhalter. The script was co-written by Wolfgang Widerhofer and Nikolaus Geyrhalter.

The film depicts how modern food production companies employ technology to produce food on large scales. It consists mainly of actual working situations without voice-over narration or interviews as the director tries to let viewers form their own opinion on the subject. The names of the companies where the footage was filmed are purposely not shown. The director's goal is to provide a realistic view on the internal workings of multiple food production companies in our modern society.

Foods transformations
Different processes in agriculture and food processing plants are shown in the film. Since scenes are mixed, food transformations are listed below with no particular order.
Semen to pigs
Pigs to meat
Semen to cows
Cows to meat
Cows to milk
Eggs to chickens
Chickens to eggs
Chickens to meat
Fish
Crops and field harvests (misc)
Tomatoes in rock wool
Salads night harvest
Peppers
Cucumbers
Apples
Olives harvest
Salt from mines

Places and companies
The names of the companies where the footage was filmed are provided on the official site  in the booklet pdf. They are listed below for convenience and to help further investigation:
Danish Crown (pork, beef) company site Europe
Tasty Tom (tomatoes) company site places Netherlands (sample Sat view)
Geflügelhof Latschenberger GmbH (eggs) Biberbach, Austria
Pro Ovo (eggs) company site Biberbach, Austria
Radatz Fleischwaren (pork) company site Vienna, Austria
Marché Couvert de Ciney (beef), Ciney, Belgium
Abattoir et Marché de Bastogne (meat), company siteBastogne,Belgium
Belgian Blue Group s.c.r.l (bulls) company site, Belgium
Zaklady Drobiarskie ‘Kozieglowy’ Sp.zo.o (chickens), company site Kozieglowy, Poland
Nutreco, Skretting, Marine Harvest, Norway, Marine Harvest processing plant Ryfisk at Hjelmeland (fish) company site Hjelmeland, Norway
Vitana (pre-cooked foods), company site, Czech Republic
Solofino (sprinkles) company site, Austria
esco European salt company GmbH & Co. KG (rock salt) company site, Germany
Agrargenossenschaft Cobbelsdorf eG (cereals), Cobbelsdorf Germany
Kalbescher Werder Agrar GmbH (milk), Brunau Germany
Quality Sprout Kerkdriel (sprouts), Kerkdriel Netherlands
Löhle Thomas Obstbau (fruits), Uhldingen-Mühlhofen, Germany
Salemfrucht GmbH (apples), Germany
Árpád - Agrár Rt. (misc) company site Hungary
Chiquita Deutschland (bananas) company site, Germany
Sucatrans BVBA (transport of art), Belgium
The Greenery (vegetables/fruits), company site, Netherlands
Jamnica d.d., (mineral water) company site, Sveta Jana (???), Croatia
Ferme la Béole (farm hostel) Belgium
SAD s.r.o. (equipment?) Brezno, Slovakia

Reception
Our Daily Bread has a 94% approval rating on Rotten Tomatoes, with the critical consensus stated as, "A matter-of-fact, nearly wordless documentary, Our Daily Breads spare presentation of slaughterhouses and human consumption serves up food for thought." It also has an 86/100 on Metacritic, and received two votes in the 2012 Sight & Sound polls of the world's greatest films.

Awards 
Award wins:
Grand Prix, Festival International du Film d'Environnement, Paris, 2006 
EcoCamera Award, Rencontres internationales du documentaire de Montréal, 2006
Best Film, Ecocinema International Film Festival Athens 2006  
Honourable Mention, Special Jury Prize - International Feature - Hot Docs Canadian International Documentary Festival Toronto 2006
Special John Templeton Prize - Visions du Réel documentary film festival, Nyon, Switzerland 2006:
Special Jury Award - International Documentary Festival Amsterdam 2005
Nominations:
Nomination, European Film Award, Prix Arte, 2006

See also

Koyaanisqatsi
Manufactured Landscapes
 Pig Business (film)

References

External links
Official site 

Our Daily Bread on Dafilms.com

2005 films
2000s Polish-language films
2000s German-language films
Documentary films about food and drink
Documentary films about environmental issues
2005 documentary films
Documentary films about agriculture
Anti-modernist films
Films directed by Nikolaus Geyrhalter
Films without speech
2005 multilingual films
Austrian multilingual films
German multilingual films